Søren Dyrberg Malling (born 3 February 1964) is a Danish actor.

Career 
Raised in Kjellerup, Malling trained at Skuespillerskolen at Odense Teater in 1992. He is best known for his role as Inspector Jan Meyer in the Danish TV crime thriller Forbrydelsen.

In 2010 Malling played Torben Friis in another Danish series, Borgen, and later had a major role in 1864, resulting in him achieving international recognition.

In his spare time Malling plays tennis. He is married to actress , who played his character's wife Hanne in Forbrydelsen. Agger also appears in Borgen.

In 2013, he received the Lauritzen Award. Malling won a Robert Award for Best Actor in a Leading Role for his role as Kjeld at the 2017 Robert Awards.

Filmography

Film 

  (1998) – Løber
 Mifunes sidste sang (1999) – Palle Alfon
  (2002) – Karsten Kørelærer
  (2002) – Brandmand
 Anklaget (2005) – Forsvarer
  (2006) – Bent
  (2007) – Tommy Jensen
  (2007) – Hans Jørgen
  (2008) – Varberg
 Den du frygter (2008) – Søren Karlsen
  (2009) – Poppo
  (2009) – Læge
  (2009) – Jacob Davantier
 Storm (2009) – Simon
 Julefrokosten (2009) – Torben
 Everything Will Be Fine (2010) – Karl
 All for One (2011)
 A Royal Affair (2012)
 A Hijacking (2012)
 A War (2015)
 Men & Chicken (2015)
 The Shamer's Daughter (2015)
 The Idealist (2015)
 Heartstone (2016)
 Parents (2016)
 Word of God (2017)
 Redbad (2018)
 The Vanishing (2018)
 Domino (2019) – Lars Hansen
  (2019) – Togmand

Television 

 Bryggeren, episode 12 (1997) – Arbejder
 Taxa, episode 31 (1998) – Mette tidligere chauffør
 Rejseholdet, episode 6 (2000) – Betjent Madsen
 Hotellet, episode 17 (2000) – Kristoffer Hansen
 Skjulte spor, episode 12–16, 18, 21–24 (2001) – Jacob Melander
 Nikolaj og Julie, episode 14 (2003)
 Forsvar, episode 4 (2003) – Steen Abelskov
 Er du skidt, skat?, episode 1 (2003) – Kurt Eierbäch
 Fjernsyn for voksne, episode 2 (2004)
 Ørnen, episode 9 (2005) – Nikolaj Groholskij
  (2006) – Carsten
 Forbrydelsen (2007) – Jan Meyer
 Deroute (2008) – Steffen fra Hvidevareproffen
  (2009) – Peter Kvist
 Borgen (2010–2022) – Torben Friis
 Wallander, The Dogs of Riga (2012) – Major Kàrlis Liepa
 1864 (2014) – Johan
 Dicte (2016) – Tonni
 Below the Surface II (2017) – Hvalsø
 The Investigation (2020) – Jens Møller Jensen

Animation 
  (2009) – Kirsebær

References

External links 
 

1964 births
20th-century Danish male actors
21st-century Danish male actors
Danish male film actors
Danish male television actors
Danish male voice actors
Living people
People from Kjellerup
Best Actor Bodil Award winners